Juuso Antonen (born 8 February 1988) is a Finnish retired ice hockey player. He played in the Liiga with Ilves and Tappara.

His younger brother, Joose, is also a professional ice hockey player and currently plays with Ilves in the Liiga.

References

External links

1988 births
Living people
Finnish ice hockey forwards
Ilves players
Lempäälän Kisa players
Ice hockey people from Tampere
Tappara players